Guilherme Giudice (born 26 September 1983) is a Brazilian football manager, currently in charge of São José (women).

Career
Born in São José dos Campos, São Paulo, Giudice worked as a youth manager at hometown side São José before joining Emily Lima's staff at the Brazil women's national team in 2016. He followed Emily to Santos' women's team, being her assistant until September 2019, when he was appointed manager after Emily was sacked.

In 2020, Giudice had to take a leave of absence for some matches after being diagnosed with four cancers in four different areas. After chemotherapy sessions amidst the COVID-19 pandemic, he was cured from all four cancers and returned to his managerial activities, and subsequently won the 2020 Copa Paulista de Futebol Feminino with Santos.

On 22 January 2021, Giudice was sacked by Santos. On 5 October, he was appointed at the helm of the women's team of São José.

Honours
Santos
Copa Paulista de Futebol Feminino: 2020

References

1983 births
Living people
People from São José dos Campos
Brazilian football managers
Santos FC (women) managers
Footballers from São Paulo (state)